Susan Jane Smith  (born 1956) is a British geographer and academic. Since 2009, she has been mistress of Girton College, Cambridge. Smith previously held the Ogilvie Chair of Geography at the University of Edinburgh from 1990 to 2004 and until 2009 was a professor of geography at Durham University, where she played a key role in establishing the Institute of Advanced Study. On 1 October 2011, she was conferred the title of Honorary Professor of Social and Economic Geography in the Department of Geography at the University of Cambridge for five years, which was renewed until 2021.

She studied at Oxford University, reading geography at St Anne's College and completing her DPhil at Nuffield College. She held research fellowships at St Peter's College, Oxford,  Brunel University and the University of Glasgow.

Smith's research is concerned with the challenge of inequality, addressing themes such as residential segregation, housing for health, and fear of crime. Her current work focuses on inequalities in the housing market. In 2010, Smith gave the Tanner Lectures on Human Values at Cambridge University with the title "Care-full markets – Miracle or Mirage?" which examined—from a perspective of the ethics of care—the moral economy of the housing market. Her work combines qualitative and quantitative approaches, and she is interested in an array of participatory techniques. In collaboration with Dr Mia Gray and the Menagerie Theatre Company, Smith has developed a project on "public choices in times of austerity", an experiment in dramatising the findings of a study in Interactive Forum Theatre style.

Smith plays euphonium with the City of Cambridge Brass Band.

Honours
In 1999, Smith was elected a Fellow of the Academy of Social Sciences (FAcSS). In 2000, she was elected Fellow of the Royal Society of Edinburgh. In 2008, she was elected Fellow of the British Academy (FBA).  In 2010, she was appointed a Tanner lecturer at Clare Hall, Cambridge, a recognition for "uncommon achievement and outstanding abilities in the field of human values". In 2014, she was awarded the Victoria Medal of the Royal Geographical Society.

References

1956 births
Living people
Academics of Durham University
Academics of the University of Cambridge
Academics of the University of Edinburgh
Mistresses of Girton College, Cambridge
Fellows of St Peter's College, Oxford
Fellows of the Academy of Social Sciences
Fellows of the British Academy
Alumni of St Anne's College, Oxford
British geographers
Fellows of the Royal Society of Edinburgh
Alumni of Nuffield College, Oxford
Women geographers
Victoria Medal recipients